Watford City High School is a public high school located in Watford City, North Dakota. Fall enrollment for the 2016–2017 school year was 549 students and is a part of the McKenzie County School District #1.

The athletic teams are known as the Wolves. Athletic teams in the area not affiliated with Watford City High School have other mascots, such as the hockey teams' mascot, the Oilers, and the public legion baseball teams' mascot, the Walleyes. This may change with the new Watford City Event Center and a proposed hockey facility.

The new high school has officially opened as of February 16, 2016.

Athletics

Championships
State Class 'B' boys' basketball: 1991
State Class 'B' football: 1975, 1976, 1978, 1979, 1985, 1986
State Class 'AA' football: 1998, 2006, 2008
State Class 'B' wrestling: 1972, 1973, 1974
State Class 'B' girls' golf: 2007
State Class 'B' baseball: 2014

References

External links
Watford City High School

Public high schools in North Dakota
Schools in McKenzie County, North Dakota
North Dakota High School Activities Association (Class B)
North Dakota High School Activities Association (Class AA Football)
Educational institutions established in 1915
1915 establishments in North Dakota